The Baldwin DRS-6-4-660, known in France as the A1AA1A 62000, is a road switcher diesel-electric locomotive built by Baldwin Locomotive Works between 1946 and 1948.

Name Designation
DRS - Diesel Road Switcher 
6 - Six axles 
4 - Four powered axles 
660 - 660 horsepower

Original buyers

References

External links

 Baldwin DRS-6-4-660

A1A-A1A locomotives
DRS-6-4-0660
Railway locomotives introduced in 1946
Standard gauge locomotives of France
Standard gauge locomotives of Morocco
Diesel-electric locomotives of France
Diesel-electric locomotives of Morocco